Bassaleg School is a comprehensive secondary school for pupils aged 11 to 18 years, situated in the suburb of Bassaleg on the western side of the city of Newport, South Wales. The present buildings of the school range in age from the early 20th century to the present day. The buildings form a natural campus, with playing fields, lawns and gardens.
It has over 1,700 pupils. Because of expanding residential development in the area, consultations took place in 2021 to 2022 to increase capacity to over 2,000 pupils by 2023. Plans were approved by Newport City Council in February 2022 and work on the project began in March 2022.

Notable former pupils

Stuart Barnes, Times journalist and former Bath, England and British Lions rugby player
Jon Callard, former Bath and England rugby player
Sabrina Cohen-Hatton, Chief Fire Officer of the West Sussex Fire and Rescue Service, homeless, whilst studying at the school
Jamie Corsi, rugby player
John Davies, Bishop of Swansea and Brecon in the Church in Wales and Archbishop of Wales
David Davies, Conservative MP for Monmouth and current Secretary of State for Wales
Ron Davies, Former AM and MP and Secretary of State for Wales
Rio Dyer, rugby player for Dragons RFC and Wales
Karl Francis, film writer and director
Anneliese Heard, triathlete
Liz Johnson, Paralympic gold medallist
Ryan Jones, former Wales and British Lions rugby player
Stephen Jones, rugby correspondent of the Sunday Times
Roger Lewis, writer and journalist, author of The Life and Death of Peter Sellers
Alix Popham, former Welsh national rugby player and budding entrepreneur
Paul Sharma, actor - Roger Roger, The Office, Gavin & Stacey and EastEnders as AJ Ahmed
Malcolm Thomas a former Welsh and British Lions rugby player who played club rugby for Newport and won 27 caps for Wales during the 1950s
Aaron Wainwright, current Welsh national rugby player
Amelia Womack, Deputy Leader Green Party of England and Wales

References

Secondary schools in Newport, Wales